Florida's 27th Senate District elects one member of the Florida Senate. The district comprises portions of Lee County. Its current Senator is Republican Ray Rodrigues.

Senators  
W. J. Turner, 1865-1866

F. B. Hogan, 1879

A. A. Robinson, 1881

M. G. Fortner, 1883

J. W. Whiddon,  1885-1887, 1893-1895, 1901-1903

Ziba King, 1889-1891

W. H. Fuller, 1897-1899

Joseph H. Humphries, 1905-1912

Frank M. Cooper, 1913-1915, 1921

A. M. Wilson, 1917

A. W. Wilson, 1918-1919

E. J. Etheredge, 1923-1927

W. D. Bell,  1929-1931

H. G. Murphy, 1933-1939

William Cliett, 1941-1943

Wilbur C. King, 1945

Jeff Flake, 1947

(Not represented, 1948 ex)

James W. Moore, 1949-1951

Doyle E. Carlton Jr., 1953-1959, 1965

G. W. (Dick) Williams, 1961-1963

Ben Hill Griffin Jr., 1967 (D)

Alan Trask, 1969-1971 (D)

Philip D. Lewis, 1973-1981 (D)

Tom Lewis, 1982 (R)

William G. "Doc" Myers, 1983-2000 (R)

Ken Pruitt, 2001-2002 (R)

Dave Aronberg, 2003-2010 (D)

Lizbeth Benacquisto, 2011-2012 (R)

Jeff Clemens, 2013-2016 (D)

Lizbeth Benacquisto, 2017-2020 (R) 

Ray Rodrigues, 2020-present (R)

References

Lee County, Florida
Florida Senate districts